Monotrema  is a group of plants in the family Rapateaceae described as a genus in 1872.

The genus is native to northern South America.

 species
 Monotrema aemulans Körn - Venezuela (Amazonas), Guyana, Brazil (Amazonas, Mato Grosso)
 Monotrema × affine Maguire - Venezuela (Amazonas)
 Monotrema arthrophyllum (Seub.) Maguire - Colombia (Vaupés, Caquetá)
 Monotrema bracteatum Maguire - Colombia (Guainía), Venezuela (Amazonas, Bolívar)
 Monotrema xyridoides Gleason - Venezuela (Amazonas), Colombia (Caquetá), Brazil (Amazonas, Roraima)

References

Poales genera
Rapateaceae
Taxa named by Friedrich August Körnicke